Keyser's Pills were an 18th-century patent medicine containing mercuric oxide and acetic acid used to treat syphilis.

Mercury was a common, long-standing treatment for syphilis. Keyser's pills were marketed by and named for Jean Keyser, a surgeon in the French military.   They were a standard treatment in the French military by the 1750s.  Keyser's solution of mercury mixed with acetic acid was intended to reduce the side-effects of mercury treatments, but still proved quite dangerous.  A trial of four women at Bicêtre Hospital caused colic, diarrhea, fevers, nausea and vomiting, and mouth ulcers to the level of gangrene.  One subject miscarried.

A clinical trial of the pills was performed in Geneva in 1761 and deemed successful, which led the pills to be a considered a good treatment for some time, though not without continuing controversy and debate.  English physician John Pringe cautioned biographer James Boswell against taking the pills, as well as Kennedy's Lisbon Diet Drink, for his venereal disease.The Oxford Illustrated Companion to Medicine, p. 628 (3d ed. 2001)  Simon-Nicholas Henri Linguet's French novel La Cacomonade also referenced the "dragées de Keyser".

The pills were also marketed in the American colonies in the 1760s and 1770s.

See also
 Swaim's Panacea

References

Patent medicines
Syphilis